Jade to the Max is the platinum-selling debut album by American R&B group Jade, released in 1992. The album produced the hit singles "I Wanna Love You" (U.S. #16), "Don't Walk Away" (U.S. #4), "One Woman" (U.S. #22), and "Looking for Mr. Do Right" (U.S. #69). It also contains covers of two songs by the 1970s R&B trio The Emotions – "Don't Ask My Neighbor" and "Blessed".

The album peaked at #56 on the Billboard 200, #19 on the Top R&B/Hip-Hop Albums, and #10 on the Top Heatseekers.

Track listing 
 Credits adapted from liner notes

Personnel

Jade
Joi Marshall – vocals
Tonya Kelly – vocals
Di Reed – vocals

Personnel
Vassal Benford – keyboards, multi-instruments
Emzie Parker, Jr. – guitars
Gerald Albright – saxophone
Lanar Brantley – bass
Ronald Spearman – drum and keyboard programming
Victor Flores – recording engineer, mixing
Conley Abrams – recording engineer, mixing
Cassandra Mills – executive producer
Steve Hall – mastering

References

External links
 
 Jade to the Max at Discogs

1992 debut albums
Giant Records (Warner) albums
Jade (American group) albums